Wenge Musica Maison Mère, also spelled as WMMM, is a musical band founded in December 1997, by musicians Werrason, Didier Masela and Adolphe Dominguez, after the split of their original band, Wenge Musica, created in 1981. Since its foundation, the band has had a rivalry with former bandmate JB Mpiana's Wenge BCBG. Under the leadership of Werrason, the group developed stars such as vocalists Ferré Gola, Héritier Watanabe, Fabregas le Métis Noir and Bill Clinton Kalonji. The band faced its first split after Ferré, Bill Clinton and JDT Mulopwe left the band to found Les Marquis de Maison Mère in 2004.

History

Foundation

Foundation and beginnings (1997–1999) 
In 1997, after the release of then-Wenge Musica vocalist JB Mpiana’s Feux de l'Amour, the band’s members started to develop a feud amongst themselves. In a concert in the GHK, the band began infighting, and according to some rumours, Werrason and Mpiana, fought onstage. All those in attendance were shocked, including Papa Wemba, who was a special guest of the band. The group split on 7 December 1997.

A couple of weeks later, on 20 December 1997, Werrason, Didier Masela, and Adolphe Dominguez, all former members of the newly-disbanded Wenge Musica, formed Wenge Musica Maison Mère.

At its foundation, the group received the support from King Kester Emeneya, Koffi Olomidé, and Marie-Paul Kambulu. Later on, they recruited singers and musicians such as Baby Ndombe, JDT Mulopwe, Didier Lacoste, Serge Mabiala, Adjani, and Ferré Gola, who came from JB Mpiana's Wenge BCBG. In 1997, the group had its first performance on the RTNC, the Congo's national TV channel.

A year later, their debut album, Force d'Intervention Rapide, was released after having been signed to Cameroonian label, JPS. The album had the remix of Kala-Yi-Boeing, a 1993 hit by Wenge Musica, composed by Ngiama, and the successful rumba song, Chantal Switzerland.

Rise and fall

From Solola Bien to Terrain Eza Miné and Bercy concert (1999–2000) 
In 1999, WMMM recorded the album Solola Bien in Paris. The album is one of the most highly-acclaimed Congolese albums. The album contains Ferré Gola’s hit song, Vita-Imana.

According to fans, the sentence Solola bien, that means Speak properly, was addressed to JB Mpiana and Wenge BCBG, as their rivalry continued to grow.

After the success of Force d'Intervention Rapide and Solola Bien, a remix of the aforementioned album was released in 2000 as Terrain Eza Miné.

After Koffi Olomidé, on 16 September 2000, Werrason and Wenge Maison Mère performed at the Palais Omnisports de Paris-Bercy, the actual AccorHotels Arena. They were "self-proclaimed" it as the Concert of the Millenary. Aimelia Lias, a singer from Wenge BCBG, who was among the public, left the group to join Maison Mère. Later, Werrason Ngiama, became the only administrator of the band, after Didier Masela and Adolphe Dominguez left the band. Masela re-created Wenge Musica, and Dominguez founded Wenge Tonya Tonya.

From Kibuisa Mpimpa to Tindika Lokito (2001–2004) 
In 2001, Werrason's first solo album, Kibuisa Mpimpa / Opération Dragon, was released. It's considered a classic album in the Soukous world. The discs [as it's a double album], contains features from Manu Dibango, Nathalie Makoma and Déesse Mukangi. The album earned Werrason and his group, 2 Kora Awards in South Africa. On 26 and 27 April 2002, after the invention of the dance move Koyimbiko, originated by a Kongo traditional chant, the group performed in the Zénith Paris for 2 days straight.

The same year, the album Solola Bien (Lingala for “Speak properly”) became a gold record after 150,000 copies were sold.

In December 2002, the album A la queue leu leu, was released. The album promotes the dance Koyimbiko, as it's written on the album art. It was the group’s last album released by the JPS Productions label. In 2004, the group returned to Kinshasa and signed sponsorship contracts with BRALIMA, a Congolese beer company. Shortly after, the group's first maxi-single, Tindika Lokito, was released. The CD was meant to promote a local Congolese brand of beer; Skol beer. During the ensuing popularity of the maxi-single, the band embarked on a tour in the United Kingdom, after which it faced one of its major splits. Then-emerging talents Ferré Gola, Bill Clinton Kalonji, J.D.T. Mulopwe, Serge Mabiala, Japonais Maladi, and others left the band to create Les Marquis De Maison Mère and released their first album Miracles, the same year.

Maison Mère's comeback 
After the split, Werrason recruited young members including animator Roi David. Alerte Générale was the maxi-single that announced the comeback of the successful group.

In 2005 Werrason released his second solo album named Témoignage.  

Between 2006 and 2008, they released another maxi-single and one album, Sous-Sol was the first disc by Werrason with a "world music" style. The album Mayi ya Sika contained 2 volumes. It was released in May 2008.

On 8 November 2008, the band played in the Zenith Paris for the third time, with guests including Youssoupha.

In 2009, the dance Techno Malewa became immensely popular in Kinshasa's streets. It was released in the albums Techno Malewa Sans Cesse and Techno Malewa Suite et Fin (released in 2010), which placed No. 2 on the Congolese Hit Parade (#1 was Bande Annonce by Zaïko Langa Langa).

2010s 
WMMM played for the fourth time in the Zénith Paris on 13 November 2010. They were invited to play in the Stade de France with fellow Congolese singers Fally Ipupa and Jessy Matador.

In 2011, with WMMM, Techno Malewa suite & fin is released 

In 2014, another Werrason solo album, Flêche Ingéta, is released in December 2014 in Paris, and January 2015 in Kinshasa.

In 2017, they recruited Sarah Solo, a Congolese female guitarist, who played in Diemba (Balançoire). After the song was released as a single, in November 2017, 7 Jours De La Semaine was released.

After recruiting singers and instrumentalists, in 2019, the album Formidable was released under Werrason’s own label, Werrason World.

In 2021 Werrason and his band announced their return to the Zénith Paris, in June. The concert was reported for the first time on September 17, 2021. By the week of the concert, the group did not have visas. For the second time the concert was reported, on September 25. The cancellation of the concert was announced later. Days later, Werrason declared at a press conference that he believes "it is an injustice and that his concert was sabotaged by the French authorities."

Discography

Studio albums 
 1998: Force d'Intervention Rapide
 1999: Solola Bien
 2000: Terrain Eza Miné
 2002: A la Queue Leu Leu
 2008: Temps Present
 2009: Techno Malewa Sans Cesse
 2010: Techno Malewa Suite et Fin

Partial live albums 
 1999: Solola Bien Live in USA
 1999: Live au Palais des Sports
 1999: Live à Toulouse
 2010: Live au Zénith de Paris

Singles and maxi-singles 
 2003: "Tindika Lokito"
 2004: "Alerte Général" 
 2006: "Sous Sol"

See also 

 Werrason

External links 

 Werrason (Press Kit)

References list 

Musical groups established in 1997
Democratic Republic of the Congo musical groups